The Kuttippuram Bridge is a bridge that connects Kuttippuram with Thavanur-Ponnani region in Malappuram district, Kerala, India. The Tirur and the Ponnani Taluks are separated by the river Bharathappuzha, which is also the second-longest river in Kerala. The bridge connects these two regions. It is a part of the National Highway 66 on Kozhikode - Kochi route. It is one of the largest as well as oldest bridges built over the river Bharathappuzha, and plays a major role in connecting the Malabar region with the erstwhile Travancore-Cochin via road.

History
Before the construction of the bridge, Kozhikode and Kochi were connected via Shornur. A bridge over the river Bharathappuzha through Kuttippuram became necessary for the construction of National Highway 66 to connect Kozhikode with Kochi. On May 8, 1949, M. Bhaktavatsalam, the then Minister of Public Works of the Government of Madras, laid the foundation stone for the bridge. The Modern Housing Construction and Properties (MHCP) Ltd. based at Chennai was chosen for the construction. The bridge was inaugurated on November 11, 1953, by Shanmugha Rajeswara Sethupathi, who was the Minister of Public Works in Madras at the time. The main architect of the bridge was K. V. Abdul Azeez from Ponnani. The chief engineer for the construction was W. H. Nambiar and the Superintendent engineer was P. T. Narayanan Nair.

Kuttippuram Palam
The popular Malayalam poem, Kuttippuram Palam, written by Edasseri Govindan Nair, published on February 21, 1954, through the magazine Mathrubhumi Azhchappathippu, describes about Kuttippuram bridge and state of the river Bharathappuzha.

See also
National Highway 66
Kuttippuram
Tavanur
Bharathappuzha
Kuttippuram railway station
Chamravattom Regulator-cum-Bridge

References

External links

Bridges in Kerala
Bridges completed in 1953
Buildings and structures in Malappuram district
20th-century architecture in India